Rep Stage was founded in 1993 by former Artistic Director Valerie Lash. It is a professional Equity theatre based in Howard County, Maryland. Rep Stage has won 7 Helen Hayes Awards, garnered 37 nominations, received 6 Greater Baltimore Theater Awards and received consistent high critical acclaim from the media for its diverse programming and choice of challenging literature.

See also
 Theater in Maryland

References

External links 
 Official website of Rep Stage

Theatres in Maryland
Theatre companies in Maryland
Tourist attractions in Howard County, Maryland
1993 establishments in Maryland
League of Washington Theatres